Sensory Overdrive is the sixth studio album by the Finnish glam rock singer Michael Monroe, released on 14 March  2011 through Spinefarm Records. It is Monroe's first studio album with his new backing band formed in early 2010, as well as his first studio solo album since the second break-up of his band Hanoi Rocks in 2009.

The album was produced by famed record producer Jack Douglas, who has previously worked with Aerosmith, John Lennon, Miles Davis and more. The cover features Monroe holding his eye open, "forced to watch the world in ruins and decay and I cannot shut [it]".

In the UK Rock Chart, the album reached #13. In Finland, ’’Sensory Overdrive’’ topped the albums chart on its first week of release and spent 22 weeks in the Top 40. The album reached gold status in December 2011 with sales exceeding 10 000 copies, making it Monroe’s most successful solo album in his native Finland. On 9 November 2011 ’’Sensory Overdrive’’ won the ”Album of the Year” award at the 2011 Classic Rock magazine awards. The first single, ´78´, from the album was chosen as the Rock Song Of The Year by iTunes USA and Little Steven’s Underground Garage Radio Shows listeners voted ‘Trick Of The Wrist‘ the Coolest Song Of The Year. Debauchery As A Fine Art is the same song as the previously heard Motorheaded For A Fall (from the live album Another Night In The Sun) albeit with different lyrics.

Track listing

Personnel
 Michael Monroe – lead vocals
 Ginger – guitar, vocals
 Steve Conte – guitar, vocals
 Sami Yaffa – bass
 Karl Rosqvist – drums, percussion

Additional personnel
 Lucinda Williams – vocals on "Gone Baby Gone"
 Lemmy – vocals on "Debauchery as a Fine Art"

References

2011 albums
Michael Monroe albums
Spinefarm Records albums
Albums produced by Jack Douglas (record producer)